Edwin Blake (1830 – 18 March 1914) was a 19th-century  Liberal Party Member of Parliament in Canterbury, New Zealand.

Early life
Blake was born in Hampstead, England. He and his brother Walter were both educated at Wimborne and then Eton College. Edwin Blake was a civil engineer and surveyor. In England, he worked on railway projects.

New Zealand
Edwin Blake came to Otago in 1861 and moved to Christchurch in 1863. The West Coast Gold Rush necessitated overland connections between Christchurch and the West Coast. This contract was completed by April of that year, and Walter Blake was then put in charge of sections of the dray road built over Arthur's Pass, but the contract was soon assigned to Edwin Blake. One of the sections was adjacent to Lake Brunner, at the time still part of the route to the West Coast. This was soon superseded by a more direct route built by Walter Blake that followed the Taramakau River. Edwin Blake was then commissioned to widen the track through the Otira Valley down to the Taipo River. When the road construction projects were completed, Blake settled on the West Coast.

He died on 18 March 1914 and was buried at Linwood Cemetery. Blakes Road in Belfast is named for him and his younger brother John William.

Notes

References

1830 births
1946 deaths
People educated at Eton College
Burials at Linwood Cemetery, Christchurch
English emigrants to New Zealand
New Zealand Liberal Party MPs
New Zealand MPs for Christchurch electorates
Independent MPs of New Zealand
Members of the New Zealand House of Representatives
Unsuccessful candidates in the 1881 New Zealand general election
Unsuccessful candidates in the 1884 New Zealand general election
Unsuccessful candidates in the 1893 New Zealand general election
19th-century New Zealand politicians